Zeehan  is a town on the west coast of Tasmania, Australia  south-west of Burnie. It is part of the West Coast Council, along with the seaport Strahan, and neighbouring mining towns of Dundas, Rosebery and Queenstown.

History 
The greater Zeehan area was inhabited by the indigenous Peerapper and Tommeginne clans of the North West group for over 10,000 years prior to the British colonisation of Tasmania. They were greatly coastal peoples, residing in small numbers on a diet consisting of muttonbirds, seals, swan eggs and cider gum, and constructed bark huts when strong westerly winds brought about rain and icy temperatures.

European naming
On 24 November 1642, Dutch explorer Abel Tasman became the first European explorer to sight and document the Heemskirk and West Coast Ranges. Tasman sailed his ships close to the coastal area which today encompasses the Southwest Conservation Area, south of Macquarie Harbour, but was unable to send a landing party ashore due to poor weather and did not make contact with any South West Tasmanian groups. In their circumnavigation of Tasmania between 1798–99, George Bass and Matthew Flinders named the Heemskirk Ranges mountains Mount Heemskirk and Mount Zeehan after Tasman’s ships, the warship Heemskerck (Old Dutch for "Home Church") and the  fluyt Zeehaen (Old Dutch for "Sea Rooster") in honour of Tasman's voyage of exploration. Although Dutch in origin, Bass and Flinder's Anglicised naming of Mount Heemskirk and Mount Zeehan created some of the oldest British place names in Tasmania. Only a few Dutch place names in Tasmania originate from Tasman's 1642 voyage. Most place names were not assigned in Van Diemen's Land until after the settlement of Hobart Town at Risdon Cove in 1803, although some place names originate from Bruni d'Entrecasteaux's French expedition in 1792. It was not until after the 1815 discovery of Macquarie Harbour by explorer and mariner James Kelly that many place names on the West Coast were assigned.

Mining boom
Tin was discovered nearby at Mount Bischoff in 1871 and at Mount Heemskirk in 1879. Deposits of silver and lead were discovered in the area by Frank Long in 1882 and Mount Zeehan Post Office opened on 1 August 1888. The township was named Zeehan in 1890  and over the following decades, quickly expanded due to its proximity to the Zeehan mineral field. The peak period for mining was up to the First World War, when 159 companies operated at the town’s peak and the town stock exchange had 60 members. With a main street over two miles long (3.2 km); it claimed over 20 hotels, several pubs, a hospital, and two theatres, the Gaiety Theatre and Theatre Royal.  It developed a friendly rivalry with Queenstown, and while the silver boom lasted it was known as the Silver City. In the first decade of the twentieth century it was the third largest town in Tasmania, after Hobart and Launceston. A port was established at Trial Harbour for Zeehan, however its exposure to the Roaring Forties made the site a vulnerable anchorage. After the construction of the Strahan–Zeehan Railway, Strahan became Zeehan's favourable port. The mines earned some two hundred thousand dollars per year for two decades, before progressively declining till the 1960s, when the last mines, Montana and Oceana were closed.

Decline
The population of Zeehan-Dundas peaked at 10,000 in about 1910, over ten times the current population. In the 1970s it saw increased activity due to operations at the nearby Renison Bell tin mine, and again in the 1990s. It had its own council until the early 1900s, and has since merged with surrounding councils to form the Municipality of West Coast. The town was subject to several acts of arson in the 2010s, one of which saw damage to historic buildings dating back to the 1890s. The township has had its share of criminal characters-with various acts of manslaughter, assault and aggravated burglary in its history both past and present.
During the COVID-19 pandemic, ten parcels of land, some as cheap as $8000, were sold by the West Coast Council as a means to attract new residents. It is hoped tourism will continue to bolster the local economy, with a new takeaway (Wildz Takeaway) open on the main road, and the creation of The Western Echo newspaper. A replica train set of the township is being built as a tourist attraction. The area has also seen an influx of visitors due to the bike tracks around Zeehan, Trial Harbour, Tasmania and Queenstown, Tasmania

Surrounding ecological and health repercussions
In 2021, a study of the levels of pollution in the lakes of northwest Tasmania found a level of contamination with lead copper, cadmium and arsenic equal to the most severely polluted lakes in the world. Owen Tarn and Basin Lake near Queenstown were the worst, but Dove Lake, Lake Dobson, Lake Cygnus, and Perched Lake were also affected. These lakes are in the mountainous areas up to a hundred and thirty kilometres downwind from Zeehan and Queenstown and have been adulterated by atmospheric pollution mainly caused by open cut mining proceeding uninhibited till finally controlled by the Environment Protection Act of 1973. Recent bushfires have caused an increase in atmospheric mercury levels to three or four times the pre-industrial level due to the release of mercury previously locked in trees. Evidence indicates the area has suffered from dangerous levels of environmental pollution for over a century.

Roads
Zeehan is connected with the north coast of Tasmania by the Murchison Highway, to Strahan by the Zeehan-Strahan Road,  and Queenstown by the Zeehan Highway.

Railways 

Zeehan was an important railway location—the end of the Emu Bay Railway, and the beginning of the government-owned Strahan-Zeehan Railway service that connected to Strahan and Regatta Point, where the Mount Lyell Railway connected to Queenstown.  Also at early stages of the town's history, a series of timber trams spread out from Zeehan towards the Pieman River as well as a number of other locations.

Some of the smaller railway operations east of Zeehan were unique. One had the honour of having the first Garratt steam engine designed and built for its operations.

After the government rail connection between Zeehan and Strahan closed, the Mount Lyell Company trucked its copper ore to the Emu Bay Railway terminus at Melba Flats, a few kilometres east of Zeehan.

Newspapers
See the article: Zeehan and Dundas Herald

Economy 
Dundas Mining's Avebury nickel mine, Zeehan Zinc's Comstock Mine and Bluestone Tin's Renison Bell tin mine are significant economic contributors to the community, but the majority of the town relies on tourism for its survival.

In 2018, construction began on the $280 million Granville Harbour Wind Farm, Tasmania's tallest wind farm, located 35 km north-west of Zeehan. It took Tasmania to 100 per cent renewable energy, and in 2020, it was Australia's best performing wind farm.

In 2022, Avesbury mine opened- bringing lots of job opportunities for the town of Zeehan and surrounds.

Tourism features 
The main streetscape of Zeehan is one significant feature of the town, featuring many boom-time and pre-Federation buildings. Among these attractions is the Gaiety Theatre, Grand Hotel and the West Coast Heritage Centre (formerly known as the West Coast Pioneers Museum) located within the former Zeehan School of Mines and Metallurgy building. The West Coast Heritage Centre features examples of Tasmania's mineral emblem, the valuable crystal crocoite, as well as other geological specimens and historic mining artefacts.

Notable people
The famed concert pianist Eileen Joyce was born in Zeehan, and Eileen Joyce Memorial Park in Zeehan was named in her honour. Reverend Dorothy McRae-McMahon, Australia's first openly gay clergy member and human rights activist was born in Zeehan.

Notable events
Parts of a 1925 Australian silent film, Jewelled Nights were shot on Savage River, north of the town in the Tarkine rainforest.

Bushfires were reported near Zeehan in 1896, 1908, 1977, 1980 and 2006. In November 2012 the town was threatened by bushfires from two directions. However, the alert was later removed.
There were also bushfires in February 1890 (diary of Edward Jennings and this http://nla.gov.au/nla.news-article13761103).

Bushfires also threatened Zeehan in 2019- with the fire coming approximately 2 kilometres from the town. Residents were evacuated to Queenstown and Strahan after it was decided that the school was no longer a safe locale for residents to gather.

A new television series, Bay of Fires, starring Marta Dusseldorp has been announced to be filmed at locations in Zeehan, Queenstown and Strahan in 2022.

Climate
Zeehan has a cool, wet oceanic climate (Cfb) with mild damp summers and chilly, long, rainy winters.

Gallery

See also
 Railways on the West Coast of Tasmania
 West Coast Tasmania Mines

References

Further reading
 
 Manny, L.B. (1963) Railways of the Zeehan District Australian Railway Historical Society Bulletin, October/November.
 
 
 

 
Localities of West Coast Council
Mining towns in Tasmania
1888 establishments in Australia